José Manuel Ramos-Horta  (born 26 December 1949) is an East Timorese politician currently serving as president of East Timor since May 2022. He previously served as president from 20 May 2007 to 20 May 2012. Previously he was Minister of Foreign Affairs from 2002 to 2006 and Prime Minister from 2006 to 2007. He is a co-recipient of the 1996 Nobel Peace Prize, along with Carlos Filipe Ximenes Belo, for working "towards a just and peaceful solution to the conflict in East Timor".

As a founder and former member of Fretilin, Ramos-Horta served as the exiled spokesman for the East Timorese resistance during the years of the Indonesian occupation of East Timor (1975–1999). While he continued to work with Fretilin, Ramos-Horta resigned from the party in 1988, becoming an independent politician.

After East Timor achieved independence in 2002, Ramos-Horta was appointed as the country's first foreign minister. He served in this position until his resignation on 25 June 2006, amidst political turmoil. On 26 June 2006, following the resignation of Prime Minister Mari Alkatiri, Ramos-Horta was appointed as acting Prime Minister by President Xanana Gusmão. Two weeks later, on 10 July 2006, he was sworn in as the second Prime Minister of East Timor. He was elected as President in 2007. On 11 February 2008, Ramos-Horta was shot during an assassination attempt.

After leaving office as President in 2012, Ramos-Horta was appointed as the United Nations' Special Representative and Head of the United Nations Integrated Peacebuilding Office in Guinea-Bissau (UNIOGBIS) on 2 January 2013. 

He was re-elected to the Presidency of Timor-Leste in 2012 and is currently serving his second five-year term.

Early history and family
Ramos-Horta was born in 1949 in Dili, capital of East Timor. He is of Mestiço ethnicity, being born to a Timorese mother and a Portuguese father who had been exiled to what was then Portuguese Timor by the Salazar dictatorship. He was educated in a Catholic mission in the small village of Soibada, later chosen by Fretilin as its headquarters after the Indonesian invasion. Of his eleven brothers and sisters, four were killed by the Indonesian military.

Ramos-Horta studied public international law at The Hague Academy of International Law in 1983 and at Antioch University in Yellow Springs, Ohio, where he completed an Individualized Master of Arts degree in Peace Studies with the major area of study being Public International Law and International Relations, awarded in December 1984. He was trained in human rights law at the International Institute of Human Rights in Strasbourg in 1983. He completed post-graduate courses in American foreign policy at Columbia University in 1983. He is a Senior Associate Member of the University of Oxford's St Antony's College since 1987 and speaks five languages fluently: Portuguese, English, French, Spanish, and the most commonly spoken East Timorese language, Tetum.

Ramos-Horta is divorced from Ana Pessoa Pinto, East Timor's Minister for State and Internal Administration, with whom he has a son, Loro Horta, who was born in exile in Mozambique.

Political career

Ramos-Horta was actively involved in the development of political awareness in Portuguese Timor, which caused him to be exiled for two years in 1970–1971 to Portuguese East Africa. His grandfather, before him, had also been exiled, from Portugal to the Azores Islands, then Cape Verde, Portuguese Guinea and finally to Portuguese Timor.

A moderate in the emerging Timorese nationalist leadership, Ramos-Horta was appointed Foreign Minister in the "Democratic Republic of East Timor" government proclaimed by the pro-independence parties in November 1975. When appointed minister, Ramos-Horta was only 25 years old. Three days before the Indonesian troops invaded, Ramos-Horta left East Timor to plead the Timorese case before the UN.

Ramos-Horta arrived in New York to address the UN Security Council and urge them to take action in the face of the Indonesian occupation during which an estimated 102,000 East Timorese would die. Ramos-Horta was the Permanent Representative of Fretilin to the UN for the next ten years. His friends at that time mentioned that he arrived in the United States with a total of $25 in his pocket. His financial situation was often precarious during that period. He survived partly by the grace of Americans who admired his politics and his determination. Furthermore, he was obliged to travel worldwide to explain his party's position.

In 1993, the Rafto Prize was awarded to the people of East Timor. Foreign-minister-in-exile Ramos-Horta represented his nation at the prize ceremony. In May 1994, Philippine President Fidel Ramos (no relation), bowing to pressure from Jakarta, tried to ban an international conference on East Timor in Manila and blacklisted Ramos-Horta, with the Thai government following suit later that year by declaring him persona non grata.

In December 1996, Ramos-Horta shared the Nobel Peace Prize with fellow Timorese Bishop Ximenes Belo. The Nobel Committee chose to honour the two laureates for their "sustained efforts to hinder the oppression of a small people", hoping that "this award will spur efforts to find a diplomatic solution to the conflict of East Timor based on the people's right to self-determination". The Committee considered Ramos-Horta "the leading international spokesman for East Timor's cause since 1975".

Ramos-Horta played a leading role in negotiating the institutional foundations for independence. He led the Timorese delegation at an important joint workshop with UNTAET on 1 March 2000 to tease out a new strategy, and identify institutional needs. The outcome was an agreed blueprint for a joint administration with executive powers, including leaders of the National Congress for Timorese Reconstruction (CNRT). Further details were worked out in a conference in May 2000. The Special Representative of the UN Secretary-General in East Timor, Sérgio Vieira de Mello, presented the new blueprint to a donor conference in Lisbon, on 22 June 2000, and to the UN Security Council on 27 June 2000. On 12 July 2000, the NCC adopted a regulation establishing a Transitional Cabinet composed of four East Timorese and four UNTAET representatives. The revamped joint administration successfully laid the institutional foundations for independence, and on 27 September 2002, East Timor joined the United Nations. Ramos-Horta was its first Foreign Minister.

Premiership (2006–2007) 
On 3 June 2006, Ramos-Horta added the post of Interim Minister of Defense to his portfolio as Foreign Minister, in the wake of the resignations of the previous minister. He resigned as both Foreign and Defence Minister on 25 June 2006, announcing, "I do not wish to be associated with the present government or with any government involving Alkatiri." Prime Minister Alkatiri had been under pressure to resign his position in place of President Xanana Gusmão, but in a 25 June meeting, leaders of the Fretilin party agreed to keep Alkatiri as Prime Minister; Ramos-Horta resigned immediately following this decision. Foreign Minister of Australia Alexander Downer expressed his personal disappointment at Ramos-Horta's resignation. Following Alkatiri's resignation on 26 June, Ramos-Horta withdrew his resignation to contest the prime ministership and served in the position on a temporary basis until a successor to Alkatiri was named. On 8 July 2006, Ramos-Horta himself was appointed Prime Minister by President Gusmão. He was sworn in on 10 July.

Before his appointment as Prime Minister, Ramos-Horta was considered a possible candidate to succeed Kofi Annan as United Nations Secretary-General. He dropped out of the race in order to serve as East Timor's Prime Minister, but he has indicated that he might run for the UN position at some time in the future: "I can wait five years if I am really interested in the job in 2012. I would be interested in that."

First election to presidency (2007) 
In an interview with Al Jazeera broadcast on 22 February 2007, Ramos-Horta said that he would run for president in the April 2007 election. On 25 February 2007, Ramos-Horta formally announced his candidacy. He received the support of Gusmão, who was not running for re-election. In an interview with Global South Development Magazine, Ramos-Horta revealed that Mahatma Gandhi was his greatest hero.

In the first round of the election, held on 9 April, Ramos-Horta took second place with 21.81% of the vote; he and Fretilin candidate Francisco Guterres, who took first place, then participated in the second round of the election in May. The full results of the runoff elections were made public by East Timor's National Electoral Committee spokeswoman, Maria Angelina Sarmento, on 11 May, and Ramos-Horta won with 69.18% of the vote.

He was inaugurated as President of East Timor in a ceremony at the parliament house in Dili on 20 May 2007. He had resigned as Prime Minister the day before and was succeeded by Estanislau da Silva.

Assassination attempt

On 11 February 2008, Ramos-Horta was shot in an assassination attempt. In the gun skirmish, one of Ramos-Horta's guards was wounded, and two rebel soldiers, including rebel leader Alfredo Reinado, were killed. Ramos-Horta was treated at a New Zealand Military base in Dili before being transferred to the Royal Darwin Hospital in Australia for further treatment. Doctors thought that he had been shot two or three times with the most serious injury being to his right lung. His condition was listed as critical but stable. He was placed in an induced coma on full life support, and regained consciousness on 21 February. A message from Ramos-Horta, still recovering in Darwin, was broadcast on 12 March. In this message, he thanked his supporters and Australia and said that he had "been very well looked after". A spokesman said that his condition was improving and that he had started taking short daily walks for exercise.

Ramos-Horta was released from the Royal Darwin Hospital on 19 March, although he said that he would stay in Australia for physical therapy for "a few more weeks". He also said on this occasion that he had remained conscious following the shooting and "remember[ed] every detail", describing how he was taken for treatment. On 17 April, Ramos-Horta returned to Dili from Darwin. He gave a press conference at the airport in which he urged the remaining rebels in the mountains to surrender.

2012 bid for presidency 
During the first round of the presidential elections of 2012, held on 17 March, Ramos-Horta, who was eligible for a second and final term as president, took third place with 19.43% of the vote behind the presidential candidates Francisco Guterres with 27.28% and Taur Matan Ruak 24.17% of the vote. He admitted defeat, and his term as president ended on 19 May, with the inauguration of Taur Matan Ruak as his successor.

Second election to presidency (2022) 
Ramos-Horta came out of retirement as he stated that incumbent president Francisco “Lu-Olo” Guterres had violated the constitution. He stated that if he won the presidential election, he would dissolve parliament and call for new elections. His campaign was supported by Xanana Gusmão, who was dubbed the "Kingmaker of Timor Leste". Ramos-Horta ran on a platform of poverty reduction, increasing healthcare services for mothers and children, as well as increasing job creation. He also stated that he wanted to try and improve communication across the governing political parties for the purposes of increasing stability. In addition, he stated his intention on working with the government to address supply chain issues from the ongoing COVID-19 pandemic and war in Ukraine. The runoff was between Ramos-Horta, and the incumbent Francisco Guterres. In the runoff Ramos-Horta received 62.10% of the vote and defeated Guterres in a landslide, who received 37.90% percent of the vote. Speaking to supporters in a rally, Ramos-Horta proclaimed: "I have received this mandate from our people, from the nation in an overwhelming demonstration of our people's commitment to democracy." He added he had not spoken to Guterres personally after the win but had received an invitation from Guterres' office to discuss a handover of power following the election.

The United States Department of State congratulated Ramos-Horta on his election as Timor-Leste’s next president and looked forward to strengthen the partnership between the United States and Timor-Leste. In a statement, they praised the election, stating; "We commend Timorese authorities, including the Technical Secretariat for Electoral Administration and the National Elections Commission, for administering a free, fair, and transparent election and the hundreds of thousands of Timorese voters who cast their ballots peacefully. Timor-Leste’s election serves as an inspiration for democracy in Southeast Asia, the Indo-Pacific region, and the world. This achievement represents another milestone in Timor-Leste’s tremendous work to build and strengthen its robust, vibrant democracy over its nearly 20-year history as an independent nation." His victory was also congratulated by the President of Portugal Marcelo Rebelo de Sousa giving "the warmest congratulations on the election as president of the Republic of Timor-Leste".

Ramos-Horta was sworn in as president of East Timor in a peaceful transfer of power on 20 May 2022; the 20th independence anniversary of East Timor.

Other activities

Following the 2012 Guinea-Bissau coup d'état, he offered to mediate the conflict. He also served as the UN special envoy to the country.

He is the author of the book Words of Hope in Troubled Times.

Ramos-Horta has served as Chairman of the Advisory Board for TheCommunity.com, a web site for peace and human rights, since 2000. In 2001 he gathered the post 9/11 statements of 28 Nobel Peace Prize Laureates on the web site, and has spearheaded other peace initiatives with his fellow Nobel Laureates.

Ramos-Horta supported the U.S. invasion and occupation of Iraq and condemned the anti-American tone of its detractors as "hypocritical". In the 1990s he had supported the cause of Kurdish people in Iraq.

In May 2009 Ramos-Horta stated that he would ask the International Criminal Court to investigate the ruling junta of Myanmar if they continue to detain fellow Nobel Laureate Aung San Suu Kyi. However, by August 2010, he had softened his views on Myanmar, warmly receiving the Myanmar Foreign Minister Nyan Win, and said that he wanted to improve relations and seek strong commercial ties with Myanmar.

In 2006, Ramos-Horta pledged his support for the International Simultaneous Policy (SIMPOL) which seeks to end the usual deadlock in tackling global issues.

On 5 August 2009, he attended the funeral of the former President of the Philippines Corazon Aquino. He was the only foreign head of state to attend. On 30 June 2010, he attended the inauguration of Benigno S. Aquino III, the 15th President of the Philippines. He was, again, the only head of state who attended the inauguration and the first dignitary to arrive in the Philippines for the inauguration. The two attendances effectively solidified East Timorese-Filipino diplomatic relations, to an extent where Filipino support for East Timorese ascension to ASEAN favorably increased.

Ramos-Horta is a Member of the Global Leadership Foundation, an organization which works to support democratic leadership, prevent and resolve conflict through mediation and promote good governance in the form of democratic institutions, open markets, human rights and the rule of law. It does so by making available, discreetly and in confidence, the experience of former leaders to today's national leaders. It is a not-for-profit organization composed of former heads of government, senior governmental and international organization officials who work closely with Heads of Government on governance-related issues of concern to them.

In August 2017, ten Nobel Peace Prize laureates, including Ramos-Horta, urged Saudi Arabia to stop the executions of 14 young people for participating in the 2011–12 Saudi Arabian protests.

He is also a television presenter of Horta Show in Radio-Televisão Timor Leste.

In 2021 Ramos-Horta joined the judging committee for the Zayed Award for Human Fraternity, an annual award instituted "to promote human fraternity values around the world and to fulfill the aspirations of the Document on Human Fraternity, co-signed by His Holiness Pope Francis and His Eminence the Grand Imam of Al-Azhar Professor Ahmed Al-Tayeb in 2019". The first meeting of the committee was held in the Vatican with Pope Francis on 6 October, 2021.

Awards

Nobel Prize

The Roman Catholic bishop Ximenes Belo of East Timor and Ramos-Horta were jointly awarded the 1996 Nobel Peace Prize for their efforts.

Other awards
 Golden Plate Award of the American Academy of Achievement (2002)

Honours
 Grand-Cross of the Order of Liberty, Portugal (9 June 1998)
 Grand Collar of the Order of Prince Henry, Portugal (13 November 2007)
 Honorary Companion of the Order of Australia, Australia (25 November 2013), for eminent service to strengthening Australia and Timor-Leste bilateral relations and for his outstanding leadership to bring independence to Timor-Leste.
Conferred an Honorary Doctorate in Political Science by the University of Cambodia (2010)

Film depictions
The 2000 documentary The Diplomat, directed by Tom Zubrycki, follows Ramos-Horta in the period from 1998 to his return to East Timor in 2000. Ramos-Horta is played by Oscar Isaac in the 2009 film Balibo. The film tells the story of the Balibo Five and the events preceding the Indonesian occupation of East Timor.

See also
 2007 East Timorese presidential election
 2012 East Timorese presidential election
 List of peace activists

References

Further reading

External links

 Ramos-Horta's website
 
 

|-

|-

|-

|-

|-

1949 births
Catholic socialists
East Timorese Christian socialists
East Timorese lawyers
East Timorese Nobel laureates
East Timorese people of Portuguese descent
Television presenters
East Timorese refugees
East Timorese Roman Catholics
Fellows of St Antony's College, Oxford
Grand Crosses of the Order of Liberty
Grand Collars of the Order of Prince Henry
The Hague Academy of International Law people
Honorary Companions of the Order of Australia
Living people
Nobel Peace Prize laureates
Columbia University alumni
People from Dili
Presidents of East Timor
Prime Ministers of East Timor
Recipients of the Order of Timor-Leste
Fretilin politicians
Shooting survivors
Defense ministers of East Timor